Hamleys is a British multinational toy retailer, owned by Reliance Retail. The world's oldest toy store, it was founded by William Hamley as "Noah's Ark" in High Holborn, London, in 1760. It moved to its current site on Regent Street in London's West End in 1881. This flagship store is set over seven floors, with more than 50,000 lines of toys on sale. It receives around five million visitors each year. The chain has 15 outlets in the United Kingdom and also has more than 90 franchises worldwide.

History
Hamleys is the oldest and in 1994 was the largest toy shop in the world. It is named after William Hamley, who founded a toy shop called "Noah's Ark" at No. 231 High Holborn, London, in 1760. Ownership of the shop passed through the family, and by the time it was operated by Hamley's grandsons in 1837, the store had become famous, counting royalty and nobility among its customers.

A branch at 200 Regent Street in the West End of London was opened in 1881. The original High Holborn store was destroyed by fire in 1901 and subsequently relocated to 86–87 High Holborn.

Hamleys suffered a downturn through the 1920s and closed, entering receivership, in 1931. After ensuring that it would not alienate their suppliers, the Lines Bros toy company, Hamleys' largest creditor, purchased the company and reopened the Regent Street store by the end of that year, keeping it largely independent. The High Holborn branch, opened in 1901, would not reopen under the new ownership

In 1938, Queen Mary, consort of King George V, gave Hamleys a royal warrant. During the Second World War, the Regent Street store was bombed five times. In 1955, Queen Elizabeth II gave the company a second royal warrant as a "toys and sports merchant".

In 1981, Hamleys would move to 188–196 Regent Street.The following year, it was purchased by the department store chain Debenhams. Debenhams itself was the subject of a takeover in August 1985 by the Burton Group. Burton Group divested Hamleys in August 1986 to Harris Queensway, a retail group led by Philip Harris. At the time it was said that a strategic plan had been formulated to build on the strength of the brand to ensure the company lived up to its reputation. The Harris Queensway group, including Hamleys, was taken over in 1988 to become Lowdnes Queensway. Hamleys was sold by Lowndes Queensway in May 1989 to a group led by Duncan Chadwick for £22 million.

Hamleys was bought in June 2003 by the Baugur Group, an Icelandic investment company. When Baugur collapsed, its stake in the toy store was taken over by the Icelandic bank Landsbanki. In September 2012 Groupe Ludendo, a toy retailer based in France with shops also located in Belgium, Spain and Switzerland, bought Hamleys for a reported £60 million.

In October 2015 it was reported that Groupe Ludendo was negotiating the sale of Hamleys, possibly to a Hong Kong company owned by a relative of the owner of department store House of Fraser. It was subsequently purchased by C.Banner, a large Chinese footwear and fashion wear conglomerate based in Nanjing.

In May 2019, Indian retail company, Reliance Retail, part of the Reliance Industries, announced that it has acquired Hamleys for £67.96 million (around ₹620 crore) using international bank receipt.

United Kingdom stores

Regent Street

Hamleys expanded and moved its flagship store in London from No. 200 Regent Street to its current site at Nos. 188–196, Regent Street, in 1981, which in 1994 was the largest toy shop in the world.

Hamleys' flagship store has seven floors covering , all devoted to toys, with different categories of toy on each floor. The ground floor is traditionally for stuffed toys (including Steiff), and is decked out with a diverse array of stuffed animals, from regular teddy bears to more exotic plushes such as turtles and dolphins, and enormous life-sized giraffes and elephants.
Public transit is available via the Oxford Circus underground station.

Other UK stores

In 1987 Hamleys' second store opened in York. However, it closed less than 12 months later.

In 1987 Hamleys opened a new store in one of the richest shopping streets in the UK, Northumberland Street, Newcastle upon Tyne. Surprisingly, it operated for only 12 months, and closed in 1988. It had seemed a "perfect combination" (Hamleys and Northumberland Street), but it did not work out. Again, in 1987, Hamleys opened a new store in Milsom Street, in the city of Bath, North East Somerset, and just like the other stores, it also closed within 12 months.

As of 2022, there are thirty Hamleys stores across the UK, including sites at the St Enoch Centre in Glasgow, at the Trafford Centre in Greater Manchester, at Lakeside Shopping Centre in Essex, Bluewater Shopping Centre in Kent, St James Quarter in Edinburgh, St David's Centre in Cardiff, the Merry Hill Centre in the West Midlands, York,  and at airports including London Heathrow, London Gatwick, London Luton and London Stansted, and also at Meadowhall Shopping Centre in Sheffield, Liverpool ONE, Cheshire Oaks Outlet, Gateshead Metrocentre and Manchester.

Global stores

Hamleys' European footprint existed in Denmark (three small stores) and, since October 2008, the Republic of Ireland, when it opened a  store in Pembroke Avenue, located adjacent to the Town Square in Dundrum, Dublin. On 12 October 2012, a Hamleys store opened at Nacka in Stockholm, Sweden. On 19 September 2013, a Hamley store opened as part of Steen og Strøm department store in Oslo, Norway. In April 2014 the Hamleys Denmark toy chain closed all four of its Danish locations when its Nordic parent company, Kids Retails, filed for bankruptcy.

Hamleys opened its first store outside Europe in Amman, Jordan, on 18 June 2008. The three-storey store on Mecca Street is run by the group's franchisee Jordan Centre. A Dubai franchise opened with two stores on 4 November 2008.

The first store in South Asia was opened in Mumbai, India, on 9 April 2010. The  store is located in an upmarket shopping district in India's financial capital. A second store in India is located in the city of Chennai at the Express Avenue Mall. The  store has a London bus that customers can walk up through. It now has 78 stores in India, including three stores in Punjab with a recently opened store in Amritsar on 1 February 2018. Hamleys also opened its first store in Bhubaneswar at Esplanade One Mall On 10 January 2019. Hamleys also opened its first store in Lucknow at Fun Republic Mall. With this addition, the brand is now present in 26 cities with 50 stores across India.

Hamleys' opened a store in the Saudi capital Riyadh on 26 January 2012. The  shop is located in the Panorama mall at Takhassusi Street's intersection with Prince Mohammed Road.

In 2012 Hamleys opened its first store in Russia. It now operates two in Moscow, one in Saint-Petersburg and one in Krasnodar.

In 2013, Hamleys announced plans to open 20 stores across India in collaboration with Reliance Brands Ltd. The company also announced that a store would open in the One Utama Shopping Mall in Kuala Lumpur, in November 2013, the first in Southeast Asia. Malaysia is now a home for three Hamleys stores, with new outlets opened in the Quill Mall, Kuala Lumpur and in the satellite terminal of Kuala Lumpur International Airport.

In 2014, Hamleys opened its first store in the Philippines. The store opened in Central Square, Bonifacio Highstreet, Bonifacio Global City, Taguig City. A second Philippine Hamleys store is also set to open the following year. Stores Specialists Inc. (SSI) Group is the exclusive distributor of Hamleys in the Philippines.

In 2015, an Abu Dhabi franchise opened with two stores in World Trade Centre Mall (WTC) and Yas Mall, Yas Island.

In July 2015, a store opened in Plaza Singapura, Singapore. This is the first Hamleys store to be established in Singapore. Subsequently, a second store was introduced at Marina Bay Sands.

On 27 August 2015, a store opened in Victoria & Alfred Waterfront, Cape Town, South Africa. Six other stores have opened in South Africa: at Mall of Africa, Sandton City, Gateway Mall, Fourways Mall, The Zone @ Rosebank and Eastgate Mall.

In November 2015, a store opened at Antara Polanco Fashion Mall in Mexico City, its first store in Mexico. As of June 2018, there are four stores in Mexico: one in Querétaro at Antea LifeStyle Center, one in Veracruz at Andamar Lifestyle Center and two in Mexico City at Antara Polanco Fashion Mall and Artz Pedregal.

A store is present in Nicosia, Cyprus. There is also a store in Malta.

In 2016, Hamleys opened a store in Prague, Czech Republic, in Na Příkopě Street.

In 2017, a Hamleys store was opened in Hull, England to celebrate the UK City of Culture, in the shopping centre, Princes Quay.

Also in 2017, a store was opened in Warsaw, Poland, at the Galeria Północna shopping mall.

In April 2018, it was confirmed that the Dublin store would close after being open for 10 years.

In December 2018, it was also announced that the Trafford Centre branch would close after a short time in operation.

In April 2019 it was reported that an Indian Company Reliance Retail was planning to buy out the British toy store chain.

In May 2019 it was confirmed that Reliance Retail, a subsidiary of Reliance Industries Limited on 9 May 2019 signed a definitive agreement for Reliance Retail to acquire 100 per cent shares of Hamleys Global Holdings Limited. Hamleys is planning to open a Hamleys in The Gate Mall in Kuwait.

In November 2022, the dream of William Hamley came alive in Albania. This beautiful store is located in the heart of Tirana, inside the Emerald mall. It covers the entire second floor with toys, the third floor with Hamleys party rooms and attractions on both floors!

Website
In the 1990s Hamleys had two websites, one for the UK which did not sell anything, and a U.S. version with a basic inventory. This changed in 1999 with the launch of hamleys.com. The site offered worldwide shipping and focused on user experience, customer service and the sale of traditional products and collectables. The chief executive of Hamleys told Marketing magazine "I do not want to become embroiled with the likes of Toys 'R'Us, Toyzone and eToys, which are fighting on price alone and will end up making next to no margin".

In 2006, a glitch on the website allowed customers to claim a 60% discount on any product.

Econsultancy critiqued the site for its basic approach in 2013, and felt that it "doesn't do a lot to represent the brand; in fact, it may even detract from it".

See also
Reliance Retail
Benjamin Pollock's Toy Shop
Gamleys
Nintendo

References

External links

 Official website for United Kingdom

Shops in London
Retail companies of the United Kingdom
Buildings and structures in the City of Westminster
British Royal Warrant holders
Tourist attractions in the City of Westminster
Toy retailers
1760 establishments in England
Retail companies established in 1760
2019 mergers and acquisitions
Retail companies of Europe
Retail companies of the Czech Republic
Lines Bros
Toy retailers of the United Kingdom
British companies established in 1760
Reliance Retail